Ashite Ashiona is a 1967 comedic Bengali film directed by Sree Jayadrath. The film stars Bhanu Banerjee, Asit Baran, Rabi Ghosh, Ruma Guha Thakurta, Jahor Roy, Tarun Kumar Chatterjee in lead roles.

Synopsis
A neglected octogenarian, Sadananda (played by Bhanu Bandopadhyay) stumbles upon a miraculous discovery. Fed up with the ill-treatment meted out to him and his wife (Ruma Guha Thakurta) by his children, he yearns for an escape from this existence. Accidentally, he finds a solution to all the problems plaguing him in his old-age. He discovers a pond where on taking a dip one can regain his youth. When he transforms into a handsome young man after having taken a dip, many are forced to accept the miracle as real and all hell breaks loose. The plot turns funnier, from a chemist keen to investigate the composition of the pond to his children and their wives changing their attitude towards Sadananda, characters try to make the most of the situation and everything adds up to make Ashite Ashiona an evergreen comedy film in Bengali.

Cast
 Bhanu Bannerjee as Sadananda
 Asit Baran		
 Rabi Ghosh as Rabi Ghosh
 Ruma Guha Thakurta
 Jahor Roy
 Tarun Kumar Chatterjee

References

External links

1960s Bengali-language films
1967 films
Indian family films
Bengali-language Indian films
Indian comedy-drama films